Christopher Neath (born 29 January 1982 in Worcester, England) is a speedway rider in the United Kingdom.

Career 
Neath began riding as a young boy, competing in youth grasstrack competitions, winning numerous ACU Championship titles, British, National and Best Pairs. 

He first began riding league speedway in 1998, for the Newport Mavericks in the British Conference League. During the 1999 season Neath captained the Mavericks to the league title. From there he was elevated and also rode for the Newport senior team, the Wasps, in the Premier League. He further won the Premier Trophy with the Wasps in 1999. In 2001 Neath also ventured to Sweden riding to a 10.68 point average for Division 1 club Norbaggarna.

In 2002 Neath moved to Premier league rivals, the Swindon Robins. He spent two seasons at Swindon and at this time he was also 'doubling up' with the club that owns his contract, the Wolverhampton Wolves. This was quite a successful time for Neath. He won the Elite League title with Wolves in 2002 and the Premier League Four Team Championship with the Robins in 2003. However he never really settled at Swindon and he moved to the Rye House Rockets in 2004.

Neath was an instant success for the Rockets, topping the clubs averages and finishing third in the fiercely competitive Champions Chase meeting at King's Lynn. The following season, Chris again topped the Rockets averages as the team completed and League and Premier Trophy double, becoming the most successful team in the club's history. 2006 was an injury plagued season for the Rockets, however they still managed to make the League Playoffs, eventually losing out to eventual champions, King's Lynn.
In 2007 Neath was captain of the side that won the Premier League title - the club's second in two years. 

In 2008 having been a ten-year asset of the Wolverhampton Wolves Neath was awarded a testimonial meeting held at the Rye House Speedway, where he finished in third place behind Speedway Grand Prix rider Fredrik Lindgren and British Under-21 Champion Tai Woffinden.

Chris Neath has also represented Great Britain racing at Under-19, Under-21 and senior level.

An injury in the opening match of the 2012 season saw him out of speedway for the rest of the season.

References 

1982 births
Living people
British speedway riders
English motorcycle racers
Sportspeople from Worcester, England
Wolverhampton Wolves riders
Newport Wasps riders
Rye House Rockets riders
Lakeside Hammers riders